Roger Saint-Vil (also spelled St. Vil) (8 December 1949 – 7 June 2020) was a Haitian footballer who played professionally in the United States and Haiti. A left winger, he was a member of the Haitian national team at the 1974 FIFA World Cup.

Saint-Vil attended Tertullien Guilbaud primary school. In 1963 when he was sixteen, he signed for Zénith in the Haitian Third Division. In 1964, he moved to Racing Club Haïtien. He began with team's third division team, but after three games, he was called up to the first team. At some point, he moved to Violette Athletic Club. In 1974, he played for Archibald FC in Trinidad and Tobago. In 1975, he played an unknown number of games, scoring eight goals, with the Cincinnati Comets of the American Soccer League.

In 1974, Saint-Vil was an integral part of the Haiti national team's successful qualification campaign for the 1974 FIFA World Cup. His older brother, Guy Saint-Vil, was also a professional player. On 7 June 2020 he died from a coma in New York.

References
https://www.cpam1410.com/football-deuil-roger-saint-vil-le-8e-disparu-de-la-generation-dor/

External links
FIFA profile

1949 births
2020 deaths
Haitian footballers
Sportspeople from Port-au-Prince
Haitian expatriate footballers
Expatriate soccer players in the United States
Haitian expatriate sportspeople in the United States
Expatriate footballers in Trinidad and Tobago
Haitian expatriate sportspeople in Trinidad and Tobago
Racing CH players
Cincinnati Comets players
Ligue Haïtienne players
American Soccer League (1933–1983) players
Association football forwards
Haiti international footballers
1974 FIFA World Cup players
CONCACAF Championship-winning players